Back Off Scotland is a campaign group advocating against the intimidation and harassment of women attending sexual health clinics in Scotland. Their main goal is to have 150 metre buffer zones established around clinics nationwide that provide abortion services in order to deter anti-abortion protestors and demonstrators.

Formation 
The campaign, originally entitled Back Off Chalmers with reference to Chalmers Sexual Health Clinic in Edinburgh, was co-founded by University of Edinburgh students, Emma Ahlert and Lucy Grieve. The campaign to introduce 100m buffer zones around the clinic was started in October 2020 after an increase of the number of anti-abortion protestors from 40 Days for Life around the clinic. The campaigners claimed the protestors infringed on patients' right to anonymity and health care.

After launching a petition in Edinburgh on 9 November 2020, the group created a similar campaign in Glasgow and across Scotland. Following this, the campaign was renamed to Back Off Scotland.

Response 
After a petition amassing 4,800 signatures was delivered, the Edinburgh City Council debated the issues and delivered their response in February 2021. The council agreed that while they do not have the authority to implement the buffer zones themselves, they will back the movement and work with the Convention of Scottish Local Authorities in order to support the campaign on a national scale.

Emma Ahlert noted that “The city council debate was also a reminder that this issue is not unanimously agreed upon. So, we must ramp up our efforts from here!”.

Glasgow City Council wrote that they didn't believe they had the power to create buffer zones, and that this must be taken to the Scottish Government. Following the council's decision, a nationwide petition was launched via change.org to petition the Scottish Government to create new legislation.

In the 2021 Scottish Parliament Elections, the Scottish National Party and Scottish Liberal Democrats included the introduction of 'Safe Zones' around abortion clinics in their election manifesto.

In July 2022 the group held musical events in Glasgow and Edinburgh to raise funds for their campaign.

References

External links 

 Official website

Advocacy groups in the United Kingdom
2020 establishments in Scotland
Women's rights in Scotland
Abortion-rights organisations in the United Kingdom
Birth control in the United Kingdom
Women's rights organizations